Karpoor Chandra Kulish (20 March 1926 – 17 January 2006) was the founder of Rajasthan Patrika, a Hindi language newspaper of Rajasthan, India.

Born in Jain family, State Rajasthan Soda village in Malpura tehsil in Tonk district  in 1926 he started his career in journalism as an employee in a newspaper. On 7 March 1956, Kulish started his own newspaper, which became no. 1 in Rajasthan. He is best remembered for his fearless journalism. His family consists of his wife, two sons and one daughter. Kulish retired from Rajasthan Patrika on 20 March 1986.

Literary works 
Among his literary works, "America Ek Vihangam Drishti" and "Mein Dekhta Chala Gaya" gained a lot of recognition.
His biography is in Hindi in form of conversations with Kulish under a title "Dharapravah". The biography has been translated in English as, Recollecting yesterdays: glimpses from the life story of K.C. Kulish. Among his other popular literary works is Saat Sainkda. He also contributed towards 'Veda' with his two works including Vedas as Science and Ved-Vidya Praveshika. His compilation of 11 samhitas of the four Vedas, titled Shabd Veda, is considered rare.

In his later years Kulish wrote a segment titled "polampol" for the newspaper on current affairs. The series is published in form of a book, is a popular set of writings in a local Rajasthani dialect. He started Rajasthan Patrika as an evening newspaper in 1956 which later became a morning daily in the 60's. He was a Journalist, a scholar of the Vedas, a thinker, a philosopher and a poet.

Awards 
Kulish got awards for his contribution to journalism. In 1990, he got the B.D. Goenka Foundation award for "Outstanding Contribution in the Indian Language Newspaper" category for the year 1987. In 1991, he was felicitated by the then Prime Minister of India, Chandra Shekhar, for influencing the national mainstream through his contributions at the golden jubilee of the All India Editors’ Conference.

He received the Ganesh Shankar Vidyarthi Award in 2000. The Hindi Sahitya Sammelan gave him the highest honour of Prayag ‘Sahitya Vachaspati’. The Maharishi Sandipani Rashtriya Ved Vidya Pratisthan, Ujjain, honoured him.

India Post released a stamp commemorating him on 16 May 2012.

Post retirement 
Kulish later developed an interest in spirituality and Vedic sciences. He put forth the dimensions of the Vedas for the common man to understand and educate himself.

He died on 17 January 2006.

External links 
Doyen of Hindi journalism dead
Karpoor Chandra Kulish of Rajasthan Patrika is dead
Karpoor Chandra Kulish Commemorative stamp released by India Post

References 

1926 births
2006 deaths
Indian newspaper editors
Journalists from Rajasthan
People from Tonk district
20th-century Indian journalists
Indian male journalists